Gabrovka pri Zagradcu is a village north of Zagradec in the Municipality of Ivančna Gorica in central Slovenia. The area is part of the historical region of Lower Carniola. The municipality is now included in the Central Slovenia Statistical Region.

Church

The local church is dedicated to Saints Primus and Felician, and it belongs to the  Parish of Zagradec. It dates to the 17th century.

References

External links

Gabrovka pri Zagradcu on Geopedia

Populated places in the Municipality of Ivančna Gorica